In recreational mathematics, a repdigit or sometimes monodigit is a natural number composed of repeated instances of the same digit in a positional number system (often implicitly decimal).  The word is a portmanteau of repeated and digit.
Examples are 11, 666, 4444, and 999999. All repdigits are palindromic numbers and are multiples of repunits. Other well-known repdigits include the repunit primes and in particular the Mersenne primes (which are repdigits when represented in binary).

A variation of repdigits called Brazilian numbers are numbers that can be written as a repdigit in some base, not allowing the repdigit 11, and not allowing the single-digit numbers (or all numbers will be Brazilian). For example, 27 is a Brazilian number because 27 is the repdigit 33 in base 8, while 9 is not a Brazilian number because its only repdigit representation is 118, not allowed in the definition of Brazilian numbers. The representations of the form 11 are considered trivial and are disallowed in the definition of Brazilian numbers, because all natural numbers n greater than two have the representation 11n − 1. The first twenty Brazilian numbers are
 7, 8, 10, 12, 13, 14, 15, 16, 18, 20, 21, 22, 24, 26, 27, 28, 30, 31, 32, 33, ... .

History
The concept of a repdigit has been studied under that name since at least 1974, and earlier  called them "monodigit numbers". The Brazilian numbers were introduced later, in 1994, in the 9th Iberoamerican Mathematical Olympiad that took place in Fortaleza at Brazil. The first problem in this competition, proposed by Mexico, was as follows: 
A number  is called "Brazilian" if there exists an integer b such that  for which the representation of n in base b is written with all equal digits. Prove that 1994 is Brazilian and that 1993 is not Brazilian.

Primes and repunits

For a repdigit to be prime, it must be a repunit (i.e. the repeating digit is 1) and have a prime number of digits in its base (except trivial single-digit numbers), since, for example, the repdigit 77777 is divisible by 7, in any base > 7. In particular, as Brazilian repunits do not allow the number of digits to be exactly two, Brazilian primes must have an odd prime number of digits. Having an odd prime number of digits is not enough to guarantee that a repunit is prime; for instance, 21 = 1114 = 3 × 7 and 111 = 11110 = 3 × 37 are not prime. In any given base b, every repunit prime in that base with the exception of 11b (if it is prime) is a Brazilian prime. The smallest Brazilian primes are
7 = 1112, 13 = 1113, 31 = 111112 = 1115, 43 = 1116, 73 = 1118, 127 = 11111112, 157 = 11112, ... 

While the sum of the reciprocals of the prime numbers is a divergent series, the sum of the reciprocals of the Brazilian prime numbers is a convergent series whose value, called the "Brazilian primes constant", is slightly larger than 0.33 . This convergence implies that the Brazilian primes form a vanishingly small fraction of all prime numbers. For instance, among the 3.7×1010 prime numbers below 1012, only 8.8×104 are Brazilian.

It has been conjectured that there are infinitely many decimal repunit primes. The binary repunits are the Mersenne numbers and the binary repunit primes are the Mersenne primes.

It is unknown whether there are infinitely many Brazilian primes. If the Bateman–Horn conjecture is true, then for every prime number of digits there would exist infinitely many repunit primes with that number of digits (and consequentially infinitely many Brazilian primes). Alternatively, if there are infinitely many decimal repunit primes, or infinitely many Mersenne primes, then there are infinitely many Brazilian primes. Because a vanishingly small fraction of primes are Brazilian, there are infinitely many non-Brazilian primes, forming the sequence
2, 3, 5, 11, 17, 19, 23, 29, 37, 41, 47, 53, ... 

If a Fermat number  is prime, it is not Brazilian, but if it is composite, it is Brazilian.
Contradicting a previous conjecture, Resta, Marcus, Grantham, and Graves found examples of Sophie Germain primes that are Brazilian, the first one is 28792661 = 1111173.

Non-Brazilian composites and repunit powers
The only positive integers that can be non-Brazilian are 1, 6, the primes, and the squares of the primes, for every other number is the product of two factors x and y with 1 < x < y − 1, and can be written as xx in base y − 1. If a square of a prime p2 is Brazilian, then prime p must satisfy the Diophantine equation p2 = 1 + b + b2 + ... + bq-1 with p, q ≥ 3 primes and b >= 2.
Therefore, the only squared prime that is Brazilian is 112 = 121 = 111113.
There is also one more nontrivial repunit square, the solution (p, b, q) = (20, 7, 4) corresponding to 202 = 400 = 11117, but it is not exceptional with respect to the classification of Brazilian numbers because 20 is not prime.

Perfect powers that are repunits with three digits or more in some base b are described by the Diophantine equation of Nagell and Ljunggrennt = 1 + b + b2 +...+ bq-1 with b, n, t > 1 and q > 2.
Yann Bugeaud and Maurice Mignotte conjecture that only three perfect powers are Brazilian repunits. They are 121, 343, and 400 , the two squares listed above and the cube 343 = 73 = 11118.

k-Brazilian numbers

Hence, there exist numbers that are non-Brazilian and others that are Brazilian; among these last integers, some are once Brazilian, others are twice Brazilian, or three times, or more. A number that is k times Brazilian is called k-Brazilian number. 

Non-Brazilian numbers or 0-Brazilian numbers are constituted with 1 and 6, together with some primes and some squares of primes. The sequence of the non-Brazilian numbers begins with 1, 2, 3, 4, 5, 6, 9, 11, 17, 19, 23, 25, … .

 The 2-Brazilian numbers  consists of composites and only two primes: 31 and 8191. Indeed, according to Goormaghtigh conjecture, these two primes are the only known solutions of the Diophantine equation:  with x, y > 1 and n, m > 2 :  
(p, x, y, m, n) = (31, 5, 2, 3, 5) corresponding to 31 = 111112 = 1115, and,
(p, x, y, m, n) = (8191, 90, 2, 3, 13) corresponding to 8191 = 11111111111112 = 11190, with 11111111111 is the repunit with thirteen digits 1.

For each sequence of k-Brazilian numbers, there exists a smallest term. For instance, 40 is the smallest 4-Brazilian number with  40 = 11113 = 557 = 449 = 2219.

 In the Dictionnaire de (presque) tous les nombres entiers, Daniel Lignon proposes that an integer is highly Brazilian if it is a positive integer with more Brazilian representations  than any smaller positive integer has. This definition comes from the definition of highly composite numbers created by Srinivasa Ramanujan in 1915. From 360 to 321253732800 (maybe more), there are 80 successive highly composite numbers that are also highly Brazilian numbers, see  .

References

External links

Problemas IX Olimpíada Iberoamericana de Matemática

Base-dependent integer sequences
Recreational mathematics